Marlborough High School is a secondary school in Zimbabwe which is located in a Harare suburb called Marlborough. Marlborough is to the north of Harare City Centre and lies between the roads leading to Chinhoyi and Bindura from  Harare. Marlborough High School caters for school children aged between 12 and 19 years. School children of this age will be in Forms 1 to 6 of their secondary school education.

Marlborough High School was established before the independence of Zimbabwe and it served mainly white children during the colonial period. Use of English language is compulsory at all times whilst within the school grounds. There are boarding facilities at this school which serves both boys and girls. The boarding house for boys is called Chartwell House and the house for girls is called Blenheim House. Approximately 120 boys and 120 girls are boarders. The rest of the students are not boarders and come from within the school catchment area with a few coming from other residential areas of Harare.

Marlborough High School uniform comprises navy blue short and navy blue khakhi style shirt, navy blue socks and black shoes for boys in Form 1 and 2. Form 1 and 2 girls uniform comprise light blue dresses with a navy blue wide collar, navy blue socks and black shoes. Form 3 and 4 boys wear navy blue trousers and light blue shirts with a navy blue and silver stripped tie. During the winter, girls in Form 3 and 4 girls wear navy blue skirts, light blue shirts with navy blue and silver stripped tie. Boys in Forms 5 and 6 wear navy blue trousers, white shirts and navy blue and silver stripped tie and girls in Forms 5 and 6 do wear navy blue skirts, white shirts with navy blue and silver striped ties. All students wear black shoes, navy blue socks and navy blue blazers with a school emblem on the shoulder pocket.

Marlborough High School has produced a fair share of students who proceeded with further education and enrolled at University of Zimbabwe (UZ) and National University of Science and Technology (NUST) and other colleges in Zimbabwe and abroad.

Marlborough High School is popular in sports and its students excel in rugby, cricket, football, netball, basketball, tennis, volleyball, and athletics.

Schools in Zimbabwe
Harare